Zimmerdale is an unincorporated community in Harvey County, Kansas, United States.  The community is located along Old Highway 81 and a railroad line between Hesston and Newton.

History
Originally it was named Trousdale for W. Truesdale.  Later, it was renamed to Zimmerdale for Martin Zimmermann.

Geography
Zimmerdale is located at coordinates 38.1027886, -97.3900370 in the state of Kansas.

Education
The community is served by Hesston USD 460 public school district.

See also
 Trousdale, Kansas in Edwards County

References

Further reading

External links
 Harvey County Maps: Current, Historic, KDOT

Unincorporated communities in Harvey County, Kansas
Unincorporated communities in Kansas